FK Jedinstvo Ub is a professional football club based in Ub, Serbia. They compete in the Serbian First League, the second tier of the national league system.

History
In the late 1990s, the club established a partnership with Red Star Belgrade, becoming their developmental affiliate. They would soon win the Serbian League Danube in 2000 to earn promotion to the Second League of FR Yugoslavia, thus reaching the second tier for the first time ever. After suffering relegation in 2002, the club secured promotion back the following year, spending the next three seasons in the second tier of Serbia and Montenegro football.

Between 2006 and 2012, the club spent six successive seasons in the Serbian League West, the third national tier. They would suffer relegation to the Drina Zone League for the second time in 2016. Soon after, the club was taken over by Serbia internationals Nemanja Matić and Radosav Petrović. They subsequently returned to the Serbian League West in 2017. In 2020, the club celebrated its 100th anniversary.

In June 2022, the club was administratively promoted to the Serbian First League to fill the vacant spot left by Žarkovo.

Honours
Serbian League Danube (Tier 3)
 1999–2000, 2002–03

Seasons

Notable players
This is a list of players who have played at full international level.

  Nikola Beljić
  Boško Janković
  Dragan Mrđa
  Radosav Petrović
  Veseljko Trivunović
  Đorđe Tutorić
  Dušan Basta
  Nenad Kovačević
  Aleksandar Luković

For a list of all FK Jedinstvo Ub players with a Wikipedia article, see :Category:FK Jedinstvo Ub players.

Managerial history

References

External links
 Club page at Srbijasport

 
1920 establishments in Serbia
Association football clubs established in 1920
Football clubs in Serbia